Dame Areta Koopu  (née King; born 8 March 1941) is a New Zealand social worker and Māori activist. She was a member of the New Zealand Māori Council from 1987 to 1992, National President of the Māori Women's Welfare League from 1993 to 1996, and a Human Rights Commissioner from 1996 to 2001.

In the 1994 Queen's Birthday Honours, Koopu was appointed a Commander of the Order of the British Empire, for services to the community. In the 2019 Queen's Birthday Honours, she was appointed Dame Companion of the New Zealand Order of Merit, for services to Māori and the community. She is also a recipient of the New Zealand Suffrage Centennial Medal 1993.

Koopu was born in Gisborne on 8 March 1941, the daughter of Wiremu and Ngaro Alice King. She was educated at Gisborne Girls' High School, and married Hoera Koopu in 1961. The couple went on to have five children.

References

1941 births
Living people
People from Gisborne, New Zealand
People educated at Gisborne Girls' High School
Dames Companion of the New Zealand Order of Merit
Commanders of the Order of the British Empire
Māori activists
New Zealand social workers
New Zealand Māori women
Recipients of the New Zealand Suffrage Centennial Medal 1993
People of the Māori Women's Welfare League